Miss USA 1999 was the 48th Miss USA pageant, held at the Grande Palace Theatre in Branson, Missouri on February 4, 1999. Kimberly Pressler became the fourth former Miss Teen USA state delegate in five years to win or inherit the Miss USA title.

At the conclusion of the final competition, Kimberly Pressler of New York, was crowned by outgoing titleholder Shawnae Jebbia of Massachusetts. Pressler became the fourth titleholder from New York, following Shanna Moakler four years prior as Miss USA 1995. However, as Moakler inherited the crown after Chelsi Smith won Miss Universe 1995, this is the third outright win for New York, and the first in twenty years since Mary Therese Friel won Miss USA 1979.

After months of negotiation, Branson was announced as the pageant's location in November 1998.  City officials spent $125,000 of tax money to host the pageant in Branson in the hope that it would encourage tourism but admitted after the pageant that it was not worth the cost.  Sponsors contributed a further $1 million towards the hosting of the event. The pageant had previously been held in Shreveport, Louisiana from 1997 to 1998.

Shemar Moore hosted the pageant for the only time, and color commentary was added by Miss USA 1996 Ali Landry and Julie Moran, for the second consecutive year.  Entertainment was provided by Collin Raye and The Atomic Fireballs.

Results

Placements

Special awards
Miss Congeniality: Cara Jackson (Arizona)
Miss Photogenic: Elyzabeth Pham (Wisconsin)
Style Award: Kellie Lightbourn (Virginia)
Best in Swimsuit: Lauren Poppell (South Carolina)

Scores

Final competition

 Winner
 First runner-up
 Second runner-up
 Top 5 Finalist

Delegates
The Miss USA 1999 delegates were:

 Alabama – Doree Walker
 Alaska – Anna Ruble
 Arizona – Cara Jackson
 Arkansas – Allison Heavener
 California – Angelique Breaux
 Colorado – Susan Manuello
 Connecticut – Christina D’Amico
 Delaware – Jackie Pilla
 District of Columbia – Amy Alderson
 Florida – Melissa Quesada
 Georgia – Meredith Young
 Hawaii – Trini-Ann Leilani Kaopuiki
 Idaho – Amy Ambrose
 Illinois – Christina Lam
 Indiana – Pratima Yarlagadda
 Iowa – Jaclyn Solinger
 Kansas – Amanda Carraway
 Kentucky – Lori Menshouse
 Louisiana – Melissa Bongiovanni
 Maine – Heather Coutts
 Maryland – Kelly Donohue
 Massachusetts – Jennifer Krafve
 Michigan – Shannon Grace Clark
 Minnesota – Crystal VanDenberg
 Mississippi – Kari Babski
 Missouri – Teri Bollinger
 Montana – Michon Adele Zink
 Nebraska – WaLynda Sipple
 Nevada – Shaynee Smith
 New Hampshire – Candice Alana Royal
 New Jersey – Melissa MacLaughlin
 New Mexico – Michelle Rios
 New York – Kimberly Pressler
 North Carolina – Joy Hall
 North Dakota – Shayna Bank
 Ohio – Melinda Miller
 Oklahoma – Dia Webb
 Oregon – Amy Nelson
 Pennsylvania – Melissa Godshall
 Rhode Island – Claire DeSimone
 South Carolina – Lauren Poppell
 South Dakota – Shawna Gross
 Tennessee – Morgan Tandy High
 Texas – Carissa Blair
 Utah – Rachel Rasmussen
 Vermont – Nicole Lewis
 Virginia – Kelli Lightbourn
 Washington – Tammy Jansen
 West Virginia – Amanda Burns
 Wisconsin – Elyzabeth Pham
 Wyoming – Arnica Bryant

Historical significance 
 New York wins competition for the fourth time. 
 Tennessee earns the 1st runner-up position for the first time and surpasses its previous highest placement in 1997.
 California earns the 2nd runner-up position for the third time. The last time it placed this was in 1991. 
 South Carolina finishes as Top 5 for the first time and reaches its highest placement since Lu Parker won 1994.
 New Mexico finishes as Top 5 for the first time and reaches its highest placement since 1985.
 States that placed in semifinals the previous year were California, Michigan and Virginia. All of them made their second consecutive placement. 
 Oklahoma and Tennessee last placed in 1997.
 Indiana last placed in 1996.
 New York last placed in 1995.
 South Carolina last placed in 1994.
 Ohio last placed in 1990.
 New Mexico last placed in 1987.
 Utah breaks an ongoing streak of placements since 1996.
 Texas breaks an ongoing streak of placements since 1992.

Crossovers

Thirteen delegates had previously competed or would later compete in either the Miss World, Miss Teen USA or Miss America pageants.
Delegate who would later compete in Miss World:
Angelique Breaux (California) - Miss World USA 2000 (Top 10 semifinalist at Miss World 2000)
Delegates who had previously held a Miss Teen USA state title were:
Kimberly Pressler (New York) - Miss New York Teen USA 1994
Lauren Poppell (South Carolina) - Miss South Carolina Teen USA 1993 (Top 12 semifinalist at Miss Teen USA 1993)
Meredith Young (Georgia) - Miss Georgia Teen USA 1991 (1st runner-up at Miss Teen USA 1991)
Teri Bollinger (Missouri) - Miss Illinois Teen USA 1990
Trini-Ann Kaopuiki (Hawaii) - Miss Hawaii Teen USA 1991
Carissa Blair (Texas) - Miss Texas Teen USA 1992
WyLynda Sipple (Nebraska) - Miss Michigan Teen USA 1992
Amy Jo Ambrose (Idaho) - Miss Idaho Teen USA 1995
Amanda Carraway (Kansas) - Miss Kansas Teen USA 1996
Amanda Burns (West Virginia) - Miss West Virginia Teen USA 1997
Delegates who had previously held a Miss America state title:
Cara Jackson (Arizona) - Miss Arizona 1995
Lori Menshouse (Kentucky) - Miss Kentucky 1997

Judges
Dennis Basso
Joyce Brothers
Kelly Le Brock
Cheech Marin
Michelle Phillips
Kevin Richardson
Stuart Weitzman

See also
Miss Teen USA 1999
Miss Universe 1999

References

External links
Miss USA official website

1999
1999 beauty pageants
February 1999 events in the United States
1999 in Missouri